The cuckoo bee genus Ensliniana contains only one species, Ensliniana bidentata, which is found in the Mediterranean and Middle East.

References 

Megachilidae
Monotypic bee genera